The J. S. Bach-Stiftung, known in English as the J. S. Bach Foundation, is a Swiss foundation established in St. Gallen in 1999 to support the performance of the vocal works of Johann Sebastian Bach.

Founders 

The J. S. Bach-Stiftung was established, using private funds, by the musician Rudolf Lutz (artistic director) and the private banker Konrad Hummler.

World Wide Web 

In addition to CD and DVD recordings, the J. S. Bach-Stiftung operates a channel on YouTube, where selected recordings (e.g., excerpts and including individual movements from cantatas). And, since August 2015 the foundation provides its own streaming media platform, from which the complete discography is obtainable.

References

External links
 

Foundations based in Switzerland
Musical groups established in 1999
Bach orchestras
Early music choirs
1999 establishments in Switzerland